Center Valley is a defunct train station formerly operated by SEPTA Regional Rail on the former Bethlehem Line in Center Valley in the Lehigh Valley region of eastern Pennsylvania in the United States. It closed in 1981 when SEPTA terminated all diesel train service and was subsequently demolished.

References

Transportation buildings and structures in Lehigh County, Pennsylvania
Railway stations closed in 1981
1981 disestablishments in Pennsylvania
Former railway stations in Pennsylvania